The English Football League play-offs for the 2016–17 season (referred to as the Sky Bet Play-Offs for sponsorship reasons) were held in May 2017 with all finals being staged at Wembley Stadium in London.

The play-offs begin in each league with two semi-finals which are played over two legs. The teams who finished in 3rd, 4th, 5th and 6th place in the Championship and League One and the 4th, 5th, 6th and 7th-placed teams in League Two compete. The winners of the semi-finals advance to the finals, with the winners gaining promotion for the following season.

Background
The English Football League play-offs have been held every year since 1987. They take place for each division following the conclusion of the regular season and are contested by the four clubs finishing below the automatic promotion places. The fixtures are determined by final league position – in the Championship and League One this is 3rd v 6th and 4th v 5th, while in League Two it is 4th v 7th and 5th v 6th.

Championship

Championship Semi-finals

First leg

Second leg

Reading won 2–1 on aggregate.

Sheffield Wednesday 1–1 Huddersfield Town on aggregate. Huddersfield Town won 4–3 on penalties.

Championship final

League One

League One Semi-finals

First leg

Second leg

Millwall won 3–2 on aggregate.

Bradford City won 1–0 on aggregate.

League One Final

League Two

League Two Semi-finals

First leg

Second leg

Blackpool won 6–5 on aggregate.

Exeter City won 6–5 on aggregate.

League Two Final

References

 
Play-offs
English Football League play-offs
May 2017 sports events in the United Kingdom